USC&GS Wildcat was a steam launch that served in the United States Coast and Geodetic Survey from 1919 to 1941. She was the only Coast and Geodetic Survey ship to bear the name.

Wildcat spent her entire Coast and Geodetic Survey career operating in Alaskan waters.

On June 9, 1923, Wildcat helped refloat the merchant ship Anvil, which had run aground in Isanotski Strait.

References
NOAA History, A Science Odyssey: Tools of the Trade: Ships: Coast and Geodetic Survey Ships: Wildcat
NOAA History, A Science Odyssey: Tools of the Trade: Ships: Lifesaving and the Protection of Property by the Coast & Geodetic Survey 1845-1937

Ships of the United States Coast and Geodetic Survey
Survey ships of the United States